Evolve may refer to the process of evolution, incremental change over time.  Evolve may also refer to:

Arts, entertainment, and media

Music 
 Evolve (Ani DiFranco album), 2003, or the title track
 Evolve (Coldrain album)
 Evolve (Endo album), 2001
 Evolve (EP), a 2012 EP by Chelsea Grin
 Evolve (Eye Empire album), 2013
 Evolve (Imagine Dragons album), 2017
 Evolve, an album by Mo Jamil, 2018
 Evolve, 2012 album by Indus Creed
"Evolve", a 2011 song from Mýa discography

Other uses in arts, entertainment, and media
 Evolve (professional wrestling), an American professional-wrestling promotion
 Evolve (TV series), on The History Channel
 Evolve (video game), a 2015 squad-based action game
 Evolve Festival, an annual music and cultural festival

Other uses
 Evolve, a product in Kainos's suite of healthcare products
 Evolve Cars, an after-market manufacturer of sport-parts for Volvo cars
 Evolve USA, a gun safety organization

See also 
 Devolve
 Evolution (disambiguation)
 Revolve (disambiguation)